West Lancashire College (formerly Skelmersdale & Ormskirk College) is a further education college located over three sites in West Lancashire, England. The college is a part of a larger organisation called NCG.

History
Originally known as Skelmersdale & Ormskirk College, the college was originally an independently controlled institution, but was taken over by Newcastle College in 2007.

In August 2011, the college changed its name to West Lancashire College. The following month the college moved to a new £42.8 million campus, based near to its old demolished Northway Campus in Skelmersdale.

Present
The college currently offers a range of courses to students from the local area. These courses include Diplomas, NVQs, Apprenticeships, Access courses, A-Levels, and as of 2023, T-Levels. Additionally, the college also offers a range of Higher Education Foundation Degree courses.

The campus of the college contains facilities that replicate real life working environments for students to learn in. These specialised business units include hairdressing salons and a bistro, and are open to the public.

Campuses
 Skelmersdale Campus, Skelmersdale
The following campuses are no longer in use by the college:

 Westbank Campus, Yewdale, Skelmersdale - Demolished after West Lancashire College relocated to the current Skelmersdale Campus.

 Ormskirk Campus, Hants Lane, Ormskirk - Closed in 2021.
 West Lancashire Construction Academy - Closed after the CEL (Construction, Engineering and Logistics) building opened on the main Skelmersdale Campus.

References

External links

 West Lancashire College homepage
 Newcastle College homepage 
 College New Build 2011 Virtual Video

Further education colleges in Lancashire
Education in the Borough of West Lancashire
Ormskirk
Skelmersdale